Alstonia pneumatophora is a species of plant in the family Apocynaceae. It is found in Indonesia, Malaysia, and Thailand.

References

pneumatophora
Least concern plants
Taxonomy articles created by Polbot